This is list of members of the Argentine Senate from 10 December 2021 to 9 December 2023.

Composition

Senate leadership

Election cycles

List of senators

Notes

References

External links
Official site 

2021–2023
2021 in Argentina
2022 in Argentina
2023 in Argentina